Ho Non (born 5 January 1947) is a Cambodian politician. She belongs to the Cambodian People's Party and was elected to represent Kandal Province in the National Assembly of Cambodia in 2003.

References

1947 births 
Members of the National Assembly (Cambodia)
Cambodian People's Party politicians
Living people